The twenty-fifth government of Israel was formed by Yitzhak Rabin of the Labor Party on 13 July 1992, after the party's victory in the June elections. The coalition also contained the new Meretz party (an alliance of Ratz, Mapam, and Shinui) and Shas, and held 62 of the 120 seats in the Knesset. The government was also supported, but not joined, by Hadash and the Arab Democratic Party, which held an additional five seats between them.

Shas left the government on 14 September 1993, but the coalition was joined by the new Yiud faction (a three-member breakaway from Tzomet) on 9 January 1995.

Rabin was assassinated on 4 November 1995, with Shimon Peres taking over as Interim Prime Minister until forming the twenty-sixth government on 22 November.

Cabinet members

1 When Rubinstein was appointed to the post in 1994, it was renamed the Minister of Education, Culture and Sport.

2 Died in office.

References

External links
Eleventh Knesset: Government 25 Knesset website

 25
1992 establishments in Israel
1995 disestablishments in Israel
Cabinets established in 1992
Cabinets disestablished in 1995
1992 in Israeli politics
1993 in Israeli politics
1994 in Israeli politics
1995 in Israeli politics
 25